Shuhan Rural District is a rural district (dehestan) in the Central District of Malekshahi County, Ilam Province, Iran. At the 2006 census, its population was 949, in 183 families.  The rural district has 6 villages.

References 

Rural Districts of Ilam Province
Malekshahi County